The National Rally Championship is a rallying series in the Republic of Ireland. It consists series of events, organized by a different motor club representing the region. The championship consists of eight events that runs in 16 locations switching biennially.

The championship is regulated by Motorsport Ireland who are the governing body of Motorsports in the Republic of Ireland.

For sponsorship reasons the series were called Dunlop National Rally Championship between 2011 and 2014, and Triton National Rally Championship between 2015 and 2020.

Seasons

2022

Calendar

Results

2021 
The season was cancelled due to COVID-19 pandemic.

2020 
At the 2019 awards ceremony on 16 November it was announced that 2020 championship will consist of seven rounds, six of which will be counting rounds. The change in biennial calendar is the drop of Sligo Rally in September and return of Carlow Rally in May.

The important championship sponsorship was offered to Triton Showers to extended for another year. Initially committed for five years term, Triton Showers agreed to remain as title sponsors for another year.

On 12 March all motorsports events were postponed in the light of the coronavirus pandemic. On 20 March, Motorsport Ireland issued a statement that all motorsport events are suspended until 1 June 2020.
 After the government released a road map on easing the COVID-19 restrictions on 6 May, Motorsport Ireland released a statement same day that in line with Phase 4 of this road map the suspension of all motor sports events is extended until the 20 July 2020. Rally events fall under Phase 5 of the guidelines and will not be considered until after the 10 August 2020. On 19 May Motorsport Ireland cancelled the 2020 championship. Clubs might still be able to run events if they wish but it won't hold championship status.

Only the round 1 took place before rounds 2-5 were postponed, and eventually all remaining rounds were cancelled.

Calendar

2019 
The 2019 season was launched on 26 January in Mondello Park, sponsored by Triton for the fifth year in a row. The calendar, consisting of the same eight biennial events was announced. The best seven scores will count, in addition, the final two rounds will offer bonus points.

Awards 
There will be overall awards and awards for each of the 20 classes. Other awards include the Motorsport Safety Team Group N award, the rally.ie award (highest two-wheel drive in overall classification) and the Mk. 2 Champions Trophy. The Juniors will compete for Junior Trophy (Class 16A) and the National Junior Award (Class 16), with the winner qualifying for selection process for the Billy Coleman Young Rally Driver of the Year award. Navigators will participate in separate scoring and will be also awarded.

Broadcasting 
The TV coverage is captured by On the Limit Sports. The viewers can view the series on TG4 and RTE Player in Ireland, as well as on satellite channel, YouTube and Motorsport.tv.

Calendar

Results 

A total of 113 competitors have participated in at least one championship event.

Top 10 drivers overall:

Note: # - did not start

2018 
ALMC Stages Rally event originally scheduled on 15 July was cancelled prior to season start as the ALMC felt that there is lack of commitment to the event from the rally drivers, because there are too many rallies in June - July period. ALMC Stages Rally event was taking place since 1984.

Sligo Rally was admitted to the calendar instead, but rescheduled from 15 to 8 of July due to 'exceptional weather conditions' and fears that the heat will melt the road surface. However the heatwave persisted and this date was also cancelled. Eventually the rally took place on 2 September.

Carlow Mini Stages Rally organized by Carlow Motor Club and held on 20 May was not a championship counting round. Best five rounds out of seven counted towards championship title.

Calendar

Results 

Top 10 drivers overall:

Note: # - did not start

References

External links 
 Irish National Rally Championship Website 
 Old Irish National Rally Championship Website

Rally competitions in Ireland
National championships in Ireland